Ryan John Park (born 1977) is an Australian politician. He has been a Labor Party member of the New South Wales Legislative Assembly since March 2011, representing the electorate of Keira. Additionally, he has served as the NSW Shadow Minister for Health since 2019, and the Shadow Minister for the Illawarra since 2013. He is the third most senior Labor MP in the NSW Legislative Assembly.

Park lives in Corrimal with his wife Kara and two children.

Career
Park was born in Wollongong and attended local state schools. He went on to study teaching at the University of Wollongong and taught at Lake Illawarra High School.

Park then went on to work further in the NSW public service and was a Chief of staff to his predecessor David Campbell, the then Minister for Transport and Roads. After Campbell resigned from the ministry in early 2010, Park was named as deputy director-general of the Department of Transport. Later in the year, Campbell announced he would not contest the upcoming election and Park was chosen as the endorsed Labor candidate where he retained the seat. He held on against the Liberal party candidate, John Dorahy, a former professional rugby league footballer.

Park was appointed to the Shadow Ministry in 2012 as Shadow Minister for Roads, and was subsequently promoted to become Shadow Minister for Education and the Illawarra in 2013.

Second term
At the 2015 NSW election, Park received a large swing towards him, returning his seat to safe Labor status. Following this successful result, Park was promoted further to become the Shadow Minister for Transport, Infrastructure and the Illawarra. Park achieved significant media-prominence in this role.

In 2016, Deputy Opposition Leader Linda Burney resigned from the NSW Parliament to contest the federal seat of Barton. She was replaced as Deputy by Michael Daley. Following this, Park was appointed to Daley's former role as Shadow Treasurer in March 2016 and Daley took on Park's former portfolio of Infrastructure. Park became the third most senior Labor member of the Legislative Assembly at this time.

Park refused to contest the Labor leadership at the 2018 ballot, which was ultimately won by Michael Daley. Upon Daley's accession to the leadership, Park regained the Infrastructure portfolio from Daley.

Third term
After Labor's defeat at the 2019 election, Daley resigned as party leader and Deputy Leader Penny Sharpe of the Legislative Council was appointed as interim leader while a leadership election that involved the rank-and-file membership of the party took place. Park again declined to contest the leadership election and on 31 March, he was named the party's acting leader in the Legislative Assembly pending the result.

Following the leadership ballot and the appointment of Jodi McKay, Park was named Shadow Minister for Health, the South Coast, Housing and Homelessness. Park lost the Treasury and Infrastructure portfolios but retained the Shadow Ministry for the Illawarra on McKay's frontbench.

McKay resigned as Labor leader in 2021. Park once again chose not to run in the resulting leadership election. It was subsequently won by Chris Minns who retained Park as Shadow Minister for Health, the Illawarra and the South Coast and also appointed him as Shadow Minister for Mental Health. His former portfolio of Housing and Homelessness was given to Rose Jackson.

References

External links
Campaign website

1977 births
Living people
Members of the New South Wales Legislative Assembly
Australian Labor Party members of the Parliament of New South Wales
University of Wollongong alumni
21st-century Australian politicians